Forget About the World is the fourth studio album by Canadian folk music artist Jimmy Rankin. It was released on April 12, 2011 on Rankin's own Song Dog label and distributed by Fontana North. The album's first single, "Here in My Heart," was co-written with Patricia Conroy and features Keith Urban on guitar. Serena Ryder appears on "Walk That Way," Rankin's first duet since "Fare Thee Well Love."

Forget About the World was nominated for Country Album of the Year at the 2012 Juno Awards.

Track listing

References

External links
[ Forget About the World] at Allmusic

2011 albums
Jimmy Rankin albums